Cosina Voigtländer refers to photographic products manufactured by Cosina under the Voigtländer name since 1999. Cosina leases rights to the Voigtländer name from RINGFOTO GmbH & Co. ALFO Marketing KG in Germany. Cosina Voigtländer products have included 35mm film SLR and rangefinder camera bodies, and lenses for the M39 lens mount (Leica screw mount), M42 lens mount, Leica M mount, and other lens mounts.

Cameras

35 mm Rangefinder 

 Bessa L
 Bessa R
 Bessa T
 Bessa R2
 Bessa R2S
 Bessa R2C
 Bessa R2A
 Bessa R3A
 Bessa R2M
 Bessa R3M
 Bessa R4A
 Bessa R4M

Medium format rangefinder 

Bessa III

35 mm SLR 
 Bessaflex TM
 VSL 43

Lenses 
Cosina started producing cameras and lenses under the Voigtländer brand in 1999, when it introduced a new M39 mount body and lenses. It has since produced a prodigious variety of these lenses in M39x26, Leica M mount, Nikon S rangefinder mount (some fully usable with Contax RF bodies), and SLR mounts including M42 and Nikon F. Cosina produces hoods and accessory viewfinders for many of the lenses. Note that while the lenses feature familiar Voigtländer names, the optical formulas are all new.

Presently, manual focus Voigtländer lenses are available, or will soon be available in four series: the E-mount series for Sony E-mount, the VM series for Leica M-mount, the SL and SL II series for several 35 mm single-lens reflex camera mounts (Canon EF-mount, Nikon F-mount, and Pentax K-mount), and the MFT series for the Micro Four Thirds mount. Legacy lenses for the M39 lens mount, Nikon S-mount and M42 lens mount have been discontinued.

Sony E-mount 
Since October 2015, numerous Voigtländer lenses have been released for full frame Sony E-mount.

Leica M-mount 

At present (March 2018), there are 16 lenses for the Leica M-mount, which can all be combined with rangefinder except the 10 mm lens.

35 mm SLR lenses (SL II series) 
Voigtländer SL II lenses are CPU-enabled manual-focus designs available in Nikon AI-P (AI-S with Program), Pentax K-A and Canon EF mounts. The Nikon term for such a design is AI-P, although these lenses are not designated as such. The CPU of SL  lenses enables full compatibility (except for autofocus) with the full range of AF Nikon SLR cameras.

The Nikon AI-P versions enable full compatibility (except for autofocus) with all Nikon AF SLRs, similar to the AI-P manual-focus lenses Nikon has produced in the past. All metering patterns in 2-D mode, all program modes, and viewfinder focus indicators are available.

Micro Four Thirds 

On August 26, 2010, Cosina joined the Micro Four Thirds Standard Group and have since introduced the following lenses:

Discontinued lenses 

Several lenses, which were manufactured in the past, have now been discontinued.

L and VM series 

 Super-wide Heliar 15 mm F4.5 Aspherical Black/Silver
 Color-Skopar 21 mm F4 Black/Silver
 Ultra-WIDE Heliar 12 mm F5.6 Aspherical Black/Silver
 Snapshot-Skopar 25 mm F4 Black/Silver
 Color-Skopar 28 mm F3.5 Black/Silver
 Ultron 28 mm F1.9 Aspherical Black/Silver
 Color-Skopar 35 mm F2.5 P TYPE
 Color-Skopar 35 mm F2.5 C TYPE Black/Silver
 Ultron 35 mm F1.7 Aspherical Black/Silver
 Color Skopar 50 mm F2.5 Black/Silver
 Nokton 50 mm F1.5 Aspherical Black/Silver
 Color Heliar 75 mm F2.5 Black/Silver
 APO-Lanthar 90 mm F3.5 Black/Silver
 Nokton 35 mm F1.2 Aspherical

SL II series 

 Color-Skopar 20 mm F3.5 SL II Aspherical
 Color-Skopar 28 mm F2.8 SL II Aspherical
 Ultron 40 mm F2 SL II Aspherical
 Nokton 58 mm F1.4 SL II
 APO-Lanthar 90 mm F3.5 SL II

SL series 

Voigtländer SL lenses are manual-focus designs. They were sold in a variety of mounts: Nikon AI-S, Canon FD, Pentax K, M42, Minolta SR, Contax/Yashica MM, and Olympus OM. Some lenses were also available in Canon EF- and Minolta A-mount, although without autofocus. They were produced for a short time, and discontinued when Cosina introduced its Carl Zeiss "Z" series lenses.
 Ultra-wide Heliar 12 mm F5.6 Aspherical SL
 Super-wide Heliar 15 mm F5.6 Aspherical SL
 Ultron 40 mm F2 Aspherical SL
 Color-Heliar 75 mm F2.5 SL
 APO-Lanthar 90 mm F3.5 SL Close Focus
 Macro APO-Lanthar 125 mm F2.5 SL
 APO-Lanthar 180 mm F4 SL Close Focus

S SC series 

 SC Skopar 21 mm F4
 SC Skopar 25 mm F4
 SC Skopar 28 mm F3.5
 SC Skopar 35 mm F2.5
 S Skopar 50 mm F2.5
 S Nokton 50 mm F1.5 Aspherical
 S APO-Lanthar 85 mm F3.5

References

External links 
 Cosina Voigtländer (in English)
 Ringphoto Voigtländer (in German)
 La Vida Leica – In-depth reviews of Cosina Voigtländer lenses (M/LTM)
 Review of the 28/1.9 lens by Lutz Konermann
 Voigtlander Rangefinders A brief write-up on Voigtländer rangefinders by street and panoramic photographer Matthew Joseph aka Fotodudenz.
 Voigtländer Gallery Peter Chou's Voigtländer Gallery

Voigtlander
Japanese brands
Cosina cameras
Cosina rangefinder cameras
Cosina lenses